Debono is a surname of Italian origin, rooted from the Latin word "Bonus" meaning "Good". It originated in Northern Italy and its first known documentation appears in Parma in the thirteenth century, where it is recorded in deeds of property sale.

There are multiple variations of the surname, namely "Di Bono", "Del Bono", "Buono", "Buonomo", but all trace back to a common origin.

The abbreviation of De Bono from its original form into Debono (no spacing) is common in the Maltese islands. It could be found in its original form in Maltese records as early as 1420.

Notable people with the surname include:
 Andrea Debono (1821–1871), Maltese trader and explorer
 Damaso Pio De Bono (1850–1927), an Italian Bishop of Caltagirone
 Dan DeBono (born 1964), American writer and novelist
 Edward de Bono (1933–2021), Maltese philosopher, physician, author, inventor and consultant
 Emilio De Bono (1866–1944), Italian general and fascist activist
 Franco Debono (born 1974), Maltese politician
 Gaspar de Bono (1530–1604), Spanish monk of the order of Minims, venerated as blessed
 Giovanna Debono (born 1956), Maltese politician
 Joseph E. Debono (1903–1974), Maltese physician and professor
 Raphael Debono (19th century), Maltese minor philosopher.
 S. Debono (19th century), Maltese scientist, linguist and minor philosopher
 Joe Debono Grech (born 1939), Maltese politician

References

Maltese-language surnames
Italian-language surnames